Public Garden is a public park located in Hanamkonda, Telangana.

Park was developed and created by Collector S. M. Naimuddin Sahib on 19th occasion as per tablet found in park building. Funds have been sanctioned by the government to develop the park, to build a new compound wall around, and a walkers’ track in it.

References

Hanamkonda district
Parks in India
Tourist attractions in Warangal